Rama Varma XI (died November 1837) was an Indian monarch who ruled the Kingdom of Cochin from 1828 to 1837.

Reign 

Rama Varma was the nephew of Kerala Varma III and ascended the throne on his death in August 1828. Soon after his accession, Rama Varma had differences of opinion with the Diwan Seshagiri Raya who resigned in 1830 on receiving complaints from the king. Edamana Sankara Menon was appointed as his successor. But he was sacked and imprisoned by the king in October 1834 on allegations of corruption. Venkata Subbaraya was appointed Diwan in his stead.

Death 

Rama Varma died in November 1837 after a reign of nine years.

References 

1837 deaths
Rulers of Cochin
Year of birth missing